Sir William John Haley, KCMG (24 May 1901 – 6 September 1987) was a British newspaper editor and broadcasting administrator.

Biography
Haley grew up on the island of Jersey and attended Victoria College. In 1918 he began to study journalism, and in 1921 he secured his first newspaper employment at The Times, eventually being stationed in Brussels.

Early in his career on the Manchester Evening News, Haley was found to be too shy to work as a reporter. He was then transferred to subediting. He rose through the ranks becoming director of Manchester Guardian and Evening News, Ltd after 8 years.

He served as Director-General of the BBC from 1944 to 1952 and from 1952 to 1966 he was editor of The Times. At  The Times he wrote a series of light-hearted bookish articles under the pseudonym 'Oliver Edwards'. These articles were published in 1957 by Heinemann as 'Talking of Books'. While at the BBC he created the BBC Third Programme, which was replaced by BBC Radio 3 in 1967. He was made Knight Commander of the Order of St. Michael and St. George in 1946.

He was editor-in-chief of Encyclopædia Britannica from January 1968 until resigning in April 1969 in an editorial dispute over how to adapt the work to new readers. It was reported that younger executives (including the company's president, Charles E. Swanson) wanted to introduce livelier materials, while Haley favoured the traditional approach and an expansion in size.

Haley died in a nursing home in Jersey.

External links 

 The Papers of Sir William John Haley held at Churchill Archives Centre

Sources

1901 births
1987 deaths
Encyclopædia Britannica
British newspaper editors
British television executives
The Times people
People educated at Victoria College, Jersey
Jersey journalists
BBC executives
Knights Commander of the Order of St Michael and St George
20th-century British journalists
Directors-General of the BBC